Lee Anthony Connell (born 24 June 1981) is an English professional footballer who plays as a midfielder for Ramsbottom United. He played for Bury in the Football League.

External links

1981 births
Living people
Footballers from Bury, Greater Manchester
English footballers
Association football defenders
Association football midfielders
Bury F.C. players
Bacup Borough F.C. players
Leigh Genesis F.C. players
Radcliffe F.C. players
English Football League players
Prestwich Heys A.F.C. players
Ramsbottom United F.C. players